The 2015–16 Montreal Canadiens season was the 107th season of the franchise that was founded on December 4, 1909, and their 99th season in the National Hockey League.

Off-season
On September 18, 2015, it was announced that Max Pacioretty was named the 29th captain after a player vote, with Andrei Markov, P. K. Subban, Brendan Gallagher and Tomas Plekanec as alternate captains. Gallagher and Markov will be paired and Subban and Plekanec would be their own pair, with a rotating routine with one pair playing their part at home and the other on the road.

The introduction of rookie goaltender Mike Condon to the main roster also highlighted notable off season moves by the club. After a stellar pre-season performance, Condon was ultimately rewarded for his play, subsequently replacing Dustin Tokarski on the goalie tandem as back-up to starter Carey Price.

Regular season
The team began its regular season on October 7, 2015 against the Toronto Maple Leafs, recording a 3–1 victory. This season also marked the franchise's best start to a campaign with 9 consecutive wins. The Canadiens did not suffer a loss until their 10th game of the season, falling to the Vancouver Canucks' 5–1 on October 27.

Despite this, the notoriety of the 2015–16 Montreal Canadiens season had been the extensive amount of injuries which had plagued members of the main roster. At the forefront of this misfortune was starting goaltender Carey Price, who had suffered a lower-body injury during a 4‒3 loss to the Edmonton Oilers on October 29, 2015. He was sidelined with the injury until November 20 in a 5‒3 win against the New York Islanders after having missed nine games with a 5‒2‒2 record.

However, on November 25, Price re-aggravated his lower-body injury in a 5‒1 victory against the New York Rangers and did not return for the third period. At the time, Price was expected to miss an additional 6 weeks. Ultimately, Price's return did not actualize, and, on April 6, 2016, the Montreal Canadiens announced that Price would not return for the 2015–16 season. The extent of Price's injury was revealed to be a medial collateral ligament injury (MCL sprain).

On November 22, against the New York Islanders, right winger Brendan Gallagher sustained injuries to his fingers after attempting to block a shot. His injuries required surgery and was expected to miss at least six weeks. Gallagher returned for the 2016 Winter Classic in a 5‒1 win against the Boston Bruins and managed a goal and an assist, also receiving the first star of the game.

On March 10, 2016, defenseman P. K. Subban sustained a neck injury after colliding with defenseman Alexei Emelin in a 3–2 win against the Buffalo Sabres. Subban was sent to the hospital as a precautionary measure, but was released the following day with a non-serious injury. On April 6, the club announced that Subban would miss the last two games of the 2015–16 season.

Other notable injuries included those to defencemen Tom Gilbert, Jeff Petry, as well as Nathan Beaulieu. Due to the magnitude of sidelined players, many prospects had gained the opportunity to draw select time in the lineup, with Michael McCarron, Morgan Ellis, Joel Hanley, Darren Dietz, Daniel Carr, Charles Hudon, Brett Lernout, Ryan Johnston, and goaltender Charlie Lindgren all making their respective NHL debuts at some point throughout the season.

The latter half of the Canadiens' season saw them face their worst slump since the 1939-40 season. With this, Montreal missed the playoffs for the first time since 2012. No Canadian team in the NHL made the playoffs that year, marking the first time since 1970 that all Canadian teams in the NHL did not qualify for the postseason.

Standings

Schedule and results

Pre-season

Regular season

Player statistics
Final stats

Skaters

Goaltenders

†Denotes player spent time with another team before joining Canadiens. Stats reflect time with Canadiens only.
‡Traded mid-season. Stats reflect time with Canadiens only.

Player suspensions/fines

Awards and honours

Awards

Milestones

Transactions
The Canadiens have been involved in the following transactions during the 2015–16 season:

Trades

Free agents acquired

Free agents lost

Claimed via waivers

Lost via release

Player signings

Draft picks

Below are the Montreal Canadiens' selections at the 2015 NHL Entry Draft, held on June 26–27, 2015 at the BB&T Center in Sunrise, Florida.

Draft notes

 The Montreal Canadiens' second-round pick went to the Edmonton Oilers (later traded to the NY Rangers and Washington Capitals) as the result of a trade on March 2, 2015 that sent Jeff Petry to Montreal in exchange for a conditional fifth-round pick in 2015 and this pick.
 The Montreal Canadiens' fourth-round pick went to the Edmonton Oilers as the result of a trade on March 2, 2015 that sent Jeff Petry to Montreal in exchange for a second-round pick in 2015 and this pick (being conditional at the time of the trade). The condition – Edmonton will receive a fourth-round pick in 2015 if Montreal advances to the second round of the 2015 Stanley Cup playoffs – was converted on April 26, 2015 when Montreal eliminated Ottawa in first-round of the 2015 Stanley Cup playoffs.
 The Colorado Avalanche's fifth-round pick went to the Montreal Canadiens as the result of a trade on June 30, 2014 that sent Daniel Briere to Colorado in exchange for P. A. Parenteau and this pick.
 The Montreal Canadiens' fifth-round pick went to the Florida Panthers (later traded to the NY Islanders) as the result of a trade on March 4, 2014 that sent Mike Weaver to Montreal in exchange for this pick.

References

Montreal Canadiens seasons
Montreal Canadiens season, 2015-16
2015 in Quebec
2016 in Quebec
Montr